The Philippine Chess Championship is organized by the National Chess Federation of the Philippines (NCFP).

Champions before 2008

{| class="sortable wikitable"
! Year !! Champion
|-
| 1908 || Fernando Canon
|-
| 1909–1913 ||Alvah E. Johnson
|-
| 1914–1921 ||Ismael Amado
|-
| 1922–1924 ||Leopoldo Lafuente
|-
| 1925 ||Jose D. Warren
|-
| 1926 ||Datu Alip
|-
| 1927–1930 ||Adolfo Gutierrez
|-
| 1931 || Ramon Lontoc Jr.
|-
| 1932–1933 || no tournament held
|-
| 1934 || Datu Sandangan
|-
| 1935 ||Ramon Lontoc Jr.
|-
| 1936 || Rogelio Catanjal
|-
| 1937 ||Castor Catalbas
|-
| 1938 || Antonio Navarro
|-
| 1939 || William Lucena
|-
| 1940 ||Ramon Lontoc Jr.
|-
| 1941 ||Ramon Lontoc Jr.
|-
| 1942 || Max Hoeflein
|-
| 1943 ||Antonio Arce
|-
| 1944–1945 || tournament not held
|-
| 1946 ||Horacio P. Tagle
|-
| 1947 ||Ramon Lontoc Jr.
|-
| 1948 || Antonio Navarro
|-
| 1949 ||Ramon Lontoc Jr.
|-
| 1950 ||Rosendo Bandal Sr.
|-
| 1951 || Serafin Alvarez
|-
| 1952 ||Jose Pascual
|-
| 1953 ||Meliton Borja
|-
| 1954 || tournament not held
|-
| 1955 ||Jose Pascual
|-
| 1956 || Florencio Campomanes, Ramon Lontoc Jr.
|-
| 1957 ||Meliton Borja
|-
| 1958 ||Ramon Lontoc Jr.
|-
| 1959 ||Jose Pascual
|-
| 1960 ||Florencio Campomanes
|-
| 1961 || Rosendo Balinas
|-
| 1963 || Rodolfo Tan Cardoso
|-
| 1964 ||Rosendo Balinas
|-
| 1965 || Renato Naranja
|-
| 1966 ||Rosendo Balinas
|-
| 1967 ||Renato Naranja
|-
| 1970 || Eugenio Torre
|-
| 1971 ||Rosendo Balinas
|-
| 1972 ||Eugenio Torre
|-
| 1973 ||Renato Naranja
|-
| 1974 ||Eugenio Torre
|-
| 1976 ||Eugenio Torre
|-
| 1990 || Rogelio Antonio
|-
| 1996 || Rogelio Barcenilla
|-
| 1998 || Buenaventura Villamayor
|-
| 2001 ||Eugenio Torre
|-
| 2002 ||Eugenio Torre
|-
| 2004 || Darwin Laylo
|-
| 2006 ||Darwin Laylo
|}

Battle of the Grandmasters 
Since 2008 the final stages of both the open and women's championship, dubbed "Battle of the Grandmasters", have been round-robin tournaments held concurrently.
{| class="sortable wikitable"
! Year !! Place !! Open Champion !! Women's Champion
|-
| 2008 || Manila               || John Paul Gomez
|| Catherine Pereña
|-
| 2009 || Dapitan              || Wesley So
|| Shercila Cua
|-
| 2010 || Tagaytay             ||Wesley So||Rulp Ylem Jose
|-
| 2011 || Manila               ||Wesley So||Rulp Ylem Jose
|-
| 2012 || Kalibo || Mark Paragua ||Catherine Pereña
|-
| 2013 || Manila               || John Paul Gomez, on tiebreak over Oliver Barbosa || Janelle Mae Frayna
|-
| 2014 || Manila               || Eugenio Torre ||Catherine Pereña
|-
| 2015 ||                          Manila
||Richard Bitoon
||Jan Jodilyn Fronda
|-
| 2016 ||  Manila                        ||Rogelio Antonio Jr. || Janelle Mae Frayna
|-
| 2017 ||  Manila                        || Haridas Pascua || Bernadette Galas
|-
| 2018 ||                          ||  ||
|-
| 2019 ||  Quezon                        || Rogelio Barcenilla || Jan Jodilyn Fronda  
|-
| 2020 ||                         ||  || 
|-
| 2021 ||  Cebu for open, Quezon City, Manila for women's                       || Daniel Quizon || Janelle Mae Frayna
|}

Juniors & Girls Division 

{| class="sortable wikitable"
! Year !! Place !! Junior Champion !! Girl's Champion
|-
| 2002 ||                         ||  || 
|-
| 2003 ||                         ||  || 
|-
| 2004 ||                         ||  || 
|-
| 2005 ||                         ||  || 
|-
| 2006 ||                         ||  || 
|-
| 2007 ||                        || Wesley So || 
|-
| 2008 ||                         ||  ||  
|-
| 2009 ||                         ||  || 
|-
| 2010 ||                         ||  || 
|-
| 2011 ||                         ||  || 
|-
| 2012 ||                         ||  || 
|-
| 2013 ||                         ||  || 
|-
| 2014 ||                         ||  || 
|-
| 2015 ||                         ||  || 
|-
| 2016 ||                         ||  || 
|-
| 2017 ||                         ||  || 
|-
| 2018 ||                         ||  || 
|-
| 2019 ||                         ||  || 
|-
| 2020 ||                         ||  || 
|-
| 2021 ||  Quezon City, Manila                       || Alekhine Nouri || Mhage Gerriahlou Sebastian
|}

See also
Professional Chess Association of the Philippines

References

External links
 National Chess Federation of the Philippines
 Philippine Chess Portal
 2006 in review from Mark Weeks

Chess national championships
Women's chess national championships
Chess in the Philippines